The Federal Correctional Institution, Bastrop (FCI Bastrop) is an administrative-low-security United States federal prison for male inmates in Camp Swift, Texas. It is operated by the Federal Bureau of Prisons, a division of the United States Department of Justice. The facility also has an adjacent satellite prison camp that houses minimum-security offenders.

Notable incidents
On November 20, 2009, inmates Leandro Luna, 52, and Adan Chavez, 53, escaped from FCI Bastrop. The two were able to simply walk away from the facility since they were being held at the minimum-security prison camp, which has no perimeter fence. Hector Gomez, a Deputy US Marshal assigned to the Lone Star Fugitive Task Force, a team of law enforcement agents consisting of local authorities, Texas Rangers and US Marshals, said the escape had probably been in the works "for a long time" and that the task force believed that Luna and Chavez, who were serving sentences for narcotics convictions, were attempting to flee to Mexico. It took authorities two days to notify the public of the escape. Prison officials would not elaborate on the specifics of the escape or why the public was not notified sooner. Six days after the escape, Mexican authorities apprehended Luna and Chavez in Ciudad Acuña, Mexico, across from the border city of Del Rio, Texas. It was subsequently discovered that Luna and Chavez had stolen a Federal Bureau of Prisons vehicle during their escape, which was recovered in a parking lot in East Austin, Texas.

Notable inmates

Current

Former

See also

List of U.S. federal prisons
Federal Bureau of Prisons
Incarceration in the United States

References

External links
Federal Correctional Institution, Bastrop  – Official website

Buildings of the United States government in Texas
Bastrop
Bastrop
Buildings and structures in Bastrop County, Texas
1979 establishments in Texas